The 2010–11 season was Queens Park Rangers's 122nd professional season and their seventh consecutive season in the Championship. The club finished the season in first place, winning promotion to the Premier League after a 15-year absence.

Players
As of the end of the season.

First team squad

Out on loan

Transfers

In

Out

Loans in

Loans out

Championship statistics

Championship table

League performance

Fixtures & results

Pre-season

Football League Championship

FA Cup

League Cup

Records and statistics
As of the end of the season.

Appearances

Goalscorers

Clean sheets

Discipline

Captains

Overall league statistics

a One red card was later rescinded

References

Queens Park Rangers F.C. seasons
Queens Park Rangers
Queens Park Rangers Fc Season, 2010-11
Queens Park Rangers Fc Season, 2010-11